Gmina Krzynowłoga Wielka was a rural gmina (administrative district) existing from 1919 to 1954 in . Its seat was Krzynowłoga Wielka.

During the interwar period, the gmina Krzynowłoga Wielka was belonging to Przasnysz County in Warsaw Voivodeship. After the war, the commune maintained its administrative affiliation. As of July 1, 1952, the commune consisted of 14 villages: Bagienice Wielkie, Brzeski-Kołaki, Dąbrowa, Dąbrówka Ostrowska, Gadomiec-Miłocięta, Krzynowłoga Wielka (seat), Kwiatkowo, Przysowy, Rembielin, Rycice, Świniary, Ulatowo-Adamy, Ulatowo-Słabogóra and Ulatowo-Zalesie.
The commune was abolished on September 29, 1954 with the reform introducing clusters in place of communes. The unit was not restored on January 1, 1973 after the communes were reactivated, and its area was mainly included in the Chorzele and Krzynowłoga Mała communes (and fragmentary commune of Jedorożec).                         

Przasnysz County
Former subdivisions of Poland